Yevheniy Valentynovych Kostyuk (born 28 January 2002) is a Ukrainian football defender. He is currently playing on loan for Ukrainian side Nyva Vinnytsia.

Career
Kostyuk, born in Vinnytsia, is a product of his native city youth sportive school and after continued his youth career in Nyva Vinnytsia youth sportive system.

Kolos Kovalivka
After playing in the Ukrainian Second League, Kostyuk signed a deal with the Ukrainian Premier League side Kolos Kovalivka in January 2021.

References

External links
 
 

2002 births
Living people
Footballers from Vinnytsia
Ukrainian footballers
FC Nyva Vinnytsia players
FC Kolos Kovalivka players
Ukrainian Second League players
Association football defenders